Broken Hill is a 2009 drama film directed and written by Dagen Merrill, and stars Luke Arnold, Alexa Vega, and, in a supporting role, Timothy Hutton.

Synopsis
Tommy (Arnold), a gifted teenage composer, dreams of being accepted into the famous Sydney Conservatorium of Music. Unfortunately, a good band is hard to find in the middle of the Australian Outback—until an incident involving flying watermelons leads him to a group of talented prison inmates.

He meets Kat (Vega), his love interest, as part of the story.

Cast
 Luke Arnold as Tommy McAlpine
 Alexa Vega as Kat Rogers
 Timothy Hutton as George McAlpine
 Rhys Wakefield as Scott Price
 Andy McPhee as Bear
 The Fishbowl Boys as themselves
 Klayton Stainer as Watermelon Thief
Luke O'Loughlin as Fuzz

Reception
Roger Moore of the Orlando Sentinel found the sight of the lead character conducting an imaginary orchestra a little challenging, and gave the movie 2 stars (out of five).

Cary Darling of the Dallas Morning News objected to the "hardened" prisoners seeming as threatening "as Hogan's Heroes", but gave the film 3½ stars out of five.

Jeff Vice of the Deseret News praises the "gorgeous Australian settings" and the cast of "mostly fresh-faced actors," and sums it up as an "entertaining feel-good tale", before awarding the film 2½ stars out of four.

The movie (though said to be fictional) has parallels to the true life story of the jail house band Captive Edition and country singer Ricky Joan. The group was formed in Sydney's Long Bay Jail by the musician and prison volunteer Vincent Ruello. Ruello auditioned the inmates in 1993 then produced and recorded the Hope album from inside the jail auditorium. Captive Edition was contracted under Warner Chappel Music Publishing House by CEO John Bromel himself soon after hearing the CD. The grand concert finale was filmed by the Channel 10 Network at the Children's Hospital Camperdown in 1994. The Hope album spawned music rehab programmes across all Australian jails when released in 1994 to extensive media coverage.

Awards
Broken Hill took the ‘Best Feature Film - Audience Choice’ Award at the TriMedia Film Festival held in Fort Collins, Colorado (USA) and won a Best Film award at the Giffoni Film Festival in Italy. The Giffoni Film Festival website describes Broken Hill as "halfway between Sister Act and the Italian movie La musica nel Cuore.

The 2010 International Family Film Festival awarded Broken Hill the “Director’s Gold Spirit Award”, the top jury prize awarded by the Festival.

Home media
The DVD was released in the US on May 17, 2011.

References

External links
 
 
Broken Hill - The trailer

2009 films
2009 drama films
American drama films
Films set in New South Wales
Broken Hill, New South Wales
Australian drama films
2000s English-language films
2000s American films